Townend Glover (February 20, 1813 – September 7, 1883) was an American entomologist, and the first such to hold a Federal office; he was followed by 
C. V. Riley. Glover was appointed to the Bureau of Agriculture of the United States Patent Office in 1854. He has been described as one of the "finest illustrators" of insects in the United States. Townend was born in Rio de Janeiro and lost both his parents at an early age. He was brought up by his relatives in England. In 1863 he was appointed as the United States Entomologist in newly formed Department of Agriculture. Townend did not care too much about collecting and preserving insects, instead spending time on illustrating them.

References

External links
US Archive

1813 births
1883 deaths
American entomologists